Mackerel may refer to:
 Mackerel, any of a number of different species of fish
 Mackerel as food
 Mackerel sky, a formation of altocumulus clouds
 Mackerel, a type of Tabby cat
 Great Mackerel Beach, NSW, Australia
 Mackerel Islets, two small islands off eastern Tasmania, Australia
 , the name of three ships of the Royal Navy
 , the name of two submarines of the U.S. Navy